

World War I
During World War I the need to identify friendly troops in assaulting formations was made difficult by the new dispersion of troops across the battlefield. Beginning with the arrival of large number of Kitchener's Army troops in 1915, and widespread after the Battle of the Somme of 1916, each battalion of a division would have a particular sign of a distinctive coloured cloth patch, either sewn to the uniform jacket (on the sleeves, or the back of the tunic), or painted on the helmet. These distinguishing marks, known as "Battle Patches" were distinct from the Division signs, and were for the most part simple shapes and colours. The scheme for these Battle patches could be decided at division or brigade level or be based on regimental colours or insignia, and was in some cases continued down to company or even platoon level. This system did not prevent duplication across the divisions, a red square was worn by at least 14 battalions. 
In most divisions the brigade could be deduced by the shape (for example 50th (Northumbrian)), colour (for example 55th (West Lancashire)) or design theme (for example 23rd) of the patch. Few divisions had a scheme of patches that had a specific brigade patch, those which had such a scheme are shown below.

More examples can be see for the 38th (Welsh) divisions, the 146th, 147th and 148th brigades.

World War II

By the start of the Second World War, the British Army prohibited all identifying marks on its Battle Dress uniforms in 1939 save for drab (black or white on khaki) regimental or corps (branch) slip-on titles, and even these were not to be worn in the field. In May 1940 this was reinforced by Army Council Instruction (ACI) 419 prohibiting all formation marks on uniforms.

In September 1940 formation patches were authorized by ACI 1118 to identify the wearer's independent brigade or brigade group. A Brigade "Formation Badge" was sometimes worn when the formation was not attached to a division, as an Independent Infantry Brigade or brigade group (with attached other arms and services). When part of a division the infantry of a brigade wore one or more arm of service strips ( by ), red for infantry, dark green for Rifle Regiments, indicating brigade seniority, one for the senior brigade, two for the intermediate and three for the junior. As an independent brigade or brigade group the infantry would only wear one strip, the other arms would also wear their arm of service strip. Battalion specific or general regimental patches, in addition to the shoulder title, could also be worn below the arm of service stripe, but the cost of these had to be borne from regimental funds, not the War Office.

In the British Army, ACI 1118 specified that the design for the formation sign should be approved by the general officer commanding the formation and reported to the War Office. A further order of December 1941 (ACI 2587) specified the material of the uniform patch as printed cotton (ordnance issue), this replaced the embroidered felt (or fulled wool) or metal badges used previously. In other theatres the uniform patch could be made from a variety of materials including printed or woven cotton, woven silk, leather or metal embroidered felt (or fulled wool).

Infantry

Armoured and Tank

Post War
Aside from the deployment to Germany in the British Army of the Rhine, the employment of divisions has been rare since the Second World War, with Brigades often being the primary field formation.

Infantry

Armoured

Modern
Brigades consisting of supporting units maintain their own insignia as well. For use in the field the patches are also issued in subdued colours, green-black, sand shades or tan-black.

Armoured and Mechanised

Infantry

Supporting Arms

Notes

Bibliography

.
British military insignia
.Insignia
.Insignia
Insignia
Insignia
British Army brigade insignia